Charles Ramsay Devlin (29 October 1858 – 1 March 1914) was a Canadian politician who was a Member of Parliament (MP) in the House of Commons of Canada, in the Legislative Assembly of Quebec, and an Irish MP in the House of Commons of the United Kingdom of Great Britain and Ireland.

Career
Born in Aylmer, Lower Canada, the son of Charles Devlin and Ellen Roney, his father was a merchant from Roscommon in Ireland. After attending the Petit Séminaire de Montréal from 1871 to 1877, he studied at the Université Laval in the faculty of arts from 1879 to 1881 but did not graduate. It is uncertain what his profession was before being elected as the Liberal candidate in 1891 to the House of Commons of Canada for the riding of Ottawa (County of) with the help of his friend Henri Bourassa. He was re-elected in 1896 for the riding of Wright. He resigned in 1897 and was appointed Canada's first trade commissioner in Ireland and served until 1902.

In 1902, against the advice of Canadian Prime Minister Wilfrid Laurier, Devlin was elected by acclamation to the British House of Commons as the Irish Parliamentary Party candidate for  Galway Borough. From 1903 to 1906, he was secretary general of the United Irish League. After being returned in the January 1906 general election he resigned later that year to return to Canada and was elected to the Canadian House of Commons from the riding of Nicolet. He resigned in 1907, after being appointed minister of colonization, mines, and fisheries in the cabinet of Quebec Premier Lomer Gouin. He was elected to the Legislative Assembly of Quebec in a 1907 by-election in the riding of Nicolet and was re-elected in 1908 and 1912. He served until his death in 1914.

He was awarded honorary degrees from the Université Laval in 1908 and the University of Ottawa in 1910. His brother, Emmanuel Berchmans Devlin was also a member of the Canadian House of Commons.

References

External links 

 

1858 births
1914 deaths
Politicians from Gatineau
Quebec Liberal Party MNAs
Canadian people of Irish descent
Liberal Party of Canada MPs
Members of the House of Commons of Canada from Quebec
Irish Parliamentary Party MPs
Members of the Parliament of the United Kingdom for County Galway constituencies (1801–1922)
UK MPs 1900–1906
Anglophone Quebec people